Phir Chand Pe Dastak is a Hum TV comedy drama which was broadcast during Ramadan 1432, from 2 August 2011, to 30 August 2011. It is a sequel to the Hum TV comedy drama Chand Pe Dastak which was broadcast during Ramadan the previous year 2010.

Cast
 Qavi Khan
 Durdana Butt
 Khalid Anam
 Seemi Pasha
 Shama Askari
 Mehwish Hayat
 Azfar Rehman
 Javeria Abbasi
 Ihtisham Uddin
 Danish Nawaz
 Tabbasum Arif as Rozi's mother
 Ayesha Gul
 Nida Khan
 Akbar Khan
 Amber Nausheen
 Aamir Qureshi

References

External links

2011 Pakistani television series debuts
2011 Pakistani television series endings
Pakistani drama television series
Urdu-language television shows
Hum TV original programming